Hackle may refer to one of the following.

Hackle, a feather plume attached to a headdress
Hackle (wig making), a metal plate with rows of pointed needles used to blend or straighten hair
Hackles, erectile plumage or hair in the neck area
Heckling (flax), the process of dividing the ribbons of flax fibre into finer parallel filaments ready for drawing and spinning
Heckling comb, a tool for heckling flax
Hackle (artificial fly), a feather or feathers wrapped around the shank of a fishing hook of an artificial fly for fly fishing